Burail Fort is a fort situated in  present Sector 45 of Chandigarh, India. It was built during the Mughal period. It remained under the control of the Mughal Faujdar up till 1712 CE. The Faujdar was very harsh to the public. He used to keep every newly married woman with him for a few days before sending her to her husband. People complained against him to Banda Singh , who sent the Khalsa Army, which captured the fort and killed the Faujdar.

Gallery

References 

Monuments and memorials in Punjab, India
Buildings and structures in Chandigarh
Forts in Punjab, India
Tourist attractions in Chandigarh
History of Chandigarh